Vasily Borisovich Dolgolyov, (born 25 May 1951 in Rahachow, Gomel Region) is a Belarusian diplomat currently serving as the Ambassador Extraordinary and Plenipotentiary of the Belarus to Russia.

References 

1951 births
Living people
People from Rahachow
Belarusian diplomats
Ambassadors of Belarus to Russia
Belarusian State University of Informatics and Radioelectronics alumni